Tatkum Vo is a populated place situated in Pima County, Arizona, United States, adjacent to the international border with Mexico. It is a small village located on the San Xavier Indian Reservation. The name is an O'odham term meaning "snorer's chaco". Historically, it was also erroneously called Serape. The name was made official by a decision of the Board on Geographic Names on April 29, 1941.

References

Populated places in Pima County, Arizona